Ernest George Harcourt Williams (30 March 1880 – 13 December 1957) was an English actor and director. After early experience in touring companies he established himself as a character actor and director in the West End. From 1929 to 1934 he was director of The Old Vic theatre company; among the actors he recruited were John Gielgud and Ralph Richardson. After directing some fifty plays he resigned the directorship of the Old Vic but continued to appear in the company's productions throughout the rest of his career. He appeared in thirty cinema and television roles during his later years.

Life and career
Williams was born in Croydon, Surrey, the son of John Williams, a merchant. He was educated at Beckenham Abbey and Whitgift Grammar School, Croydon. After taking drama lessons he joined Frank Benson's touring company in 1897. He remained with Benson for five years, and made his London debut at the Lyceum in 1900, playing Sir Thomas Grey in Henry V.

Harcourt Williams both co-directed and starred in Rosina Filippi's adaptation of Jane Austen's Pride and Prejudice, in a play called The Bennets at the Royal Court Theatre in a special matinee on 29 March 1901. He co-directed with Winifred Mayo, doing double duty by acting as hero Mr. Darcy, opposite Mayo's Elizabeth Bennet. This makes Williams the first known actor to play Mr. Darcy on the professional stage.

He then worked for three other companies, including that of Ellen Terry, which he joined in 1903.

In 1906 Williams made his American debut, with H.B. Irving, touring the US for a year. After returning to Britain he was in George Alexander's company before returning for another period with Irving. He married the actress Jean Sterling Mackinlay in 1908. Their son John Sterling became a well-known pianist.

In the First World War, as a conscientious objector, he volunteered for the Friends' Ambulance Unit.

One of Williams's most notable parts of this period was General Lee in John Drinkwater's Abraham Lincoln in 1919; he later switched to the role of the Chronicler in the same production. In 1922, in Mary Stuart by Drinkwater, he was "exquisitely repulsive" as Darnley. In a third historical drama by the same author he was John Hampden in Oliver Cromwell at His Majesty's in 1923, to the Cromwell of Henry Ainley. In 1923 he directed G K Chesterton's play Magic at the Everyman Theatre. In 1926 he appeared in John Barrymore's production of Hamlet at the Haymarket Theatre, as the Player King.

In 1929, when he was forty-nine, Lilian Baylis appointed Williams as the new director of her Old Vic theatre company. He was responsible for engaging first John Gielgud and then Ralph Richardson to join the Old Vic as leading man. Over the next four years Williams directed about fifty plays for the company, also acting in many of the productions. He expanded the Old Vic's traditional repertoire to include modern works by Bernard Shaw and others. The biographer Jonathan Croall writes of Williams:

After leaving the directorship of the Old Vic, handing over to Tyrone Guthrie after the 1933–34 season, Williams frequently accepted invitations to act with the company, for Guthrie and his successors. He appeared in thirty film and television roles between 1944 and 1956. In 1953 he appeared in A Day by the Sea by N.C. Hunter. Williams celebrated his golden jubilee as an actor while appearing in a long-running production of Shaw's You Never Can Tell described by The Times as "the liveliest show in town". He died in London after a long illness, aged 77.

Screen roles
Williams's cinema and television roles were:

Source: British Film Institute

Notes

References

External links
  Theatre performances in the Theatre Archive, University of Bristol

1880 births
1957 deaths
English male film actors
British conscientious objectors
20th-century English male actors
People educated at Whitgift School